Paulínia Futebol Clube, or Paulínia as they are usually called, is a Brazilian football team from Paulínia in São Paulo, founded on June 10, 2004.

Home stadium is the Luís Perissinoto, with a capacity of 10,070. They play in purple shirts, white shorts and socks.

History
Paulínia was founded on June 10, 2004.

On January 1, 2008, Paulínia began its professional football activities.

Winners
 Copa Paulista Sub-17: 2008
 Campeonato Paulista de Futebol - Sub-20: 2010

Stadium

Paulínia's stadium is Estádio Municipal Luís Perissinoto, inaugurated in 2006, with a maximum capacity of 10,070 people.

Rivalries
Paulínia FC have a rivalry mainly with Sumaré, SEV Hortolândia, Primavera and Capivariano. There is also rivalry with Clube Atlético Guaçuano, Inter de Limeira and Ponte Preta.

Symbols and colors
Paulínia's mascot is a dinosaur, whose name is Dino Paulino, it was chosen in 2009, in a popular contest. The original colors of Paulínia were purple and white.

Nicknames

Paulínia Futebol Clube is sometimes called PFC, which is "Paulínia Futebol Clube" abbreviated. It is also called "Time dos Gladiadores" (Gladiator's Team), nickname given by a newspaper of the city of Paulínia, and too "o Time da cidade" (city's team).

Ultras
Torcida Uniformizada do Paulínia (TUP - Paulinia's Uniformed Torcida)
Fúria Azul (Blue Fury)

References

External links
Official Website

 
2004 establishments in Brazil
Association football clubs established in 2004